Jung Jae-won (born March 29, 1994), better known by stage name One (stylized as ONE), is a South Korean rapper, singer-songwriter, and actor. He debuted in 2015 as a member of the former hip-hop duo 1Punch with Kim Samuel. The following year he moved to YG Entertainment from D-Business Entertainment. In 2019 Jaewon left YG Entertainment and since moved under his own record label Private Only. He is well known for appearing on the fourth and fifth season of Show Me the Money, as well as appearances on dramas such as A Korean Odyssey (2017), Room No. 9 (2018), and Her Private Life (2019).

Biography

Early life
Jung Jae-won was born on March 29, 1994 in Seoul, South Korea. During his adolescent years, Jae-won dreamed of becoming a film director. He's namely mentioned liking Quentin Tarantino films as an inspiration.

2015–2016: 1Punch, Show Me the Money and move to YGE
One began his career as part of the hip hop duo 1Punch with Samuel under a collaboration between the labels D-Business Entertainment and Brave Entertainment on January 23, 2015. They debuted with the album The Anthem with lead single "Turn Me Back". On September 21, YGE had scouted and signed an exclusive contract with One, following his appearance in the fourth series of Show Me the Money. He was a member of "Team Zipal" under producers Zico and Paloalto until his elimination in the sixth episode. In the following year, he returned and participated in the fifth series of the show. This time, as a member of Team AOMG under producers Simon D and Gray, overall placing tenth in the season. Through the show, the single "Comfortable", a collaborative track with Simon D, Gray and himself achieved a perfect all kill, topping all South Korean charts at the time.

In March 2016, One made an appearance on labelmate Lee Hi's "My Star" music video as her counterpart. He also made a short appearance in the music video of labelmate MOBB's "Hit Me" in September of the same year.

2017–present: One Day, acting debut, departure from YG Entertainment and debut album
One made his debut as a solo artist under YGE following single album One Day on July 11, 2017 with self-written and produced lead singles "Gettin' By" and "Heyahe. It was also reported that he became the first male solo artist to debut from the label in 14 years since Seven's debut in 2003, excluding Kang Seung-yoon who debuted as a solo artist in 2013 but later debuted in Winner. From July 15–21, a pop-up store for One titled "One Day One Week" Magazine Shop was unveiled, displaying his album, debut films and exclusive materials. On July 21, One held his first fansign for single album "One Day" at Luft Cafe.

In October, YG Entertainment announced that One  would  start his acting career with a supporting role in tvN's drama A Korean Odyssey that was aired in December. In November, One was cast in a romantic one-act drama Anthology together with Shin Eun-soo. He played a smart and good looking country boy with a hidden secret.

In February, it was confirmed that One and Soyou were to join Channel A's Heart Signal season 2 as new panelists. In July 2018, One was confirmed to make his big screen debut with the romance film Goodbye Summer alongside Kim Bo-ra where his character was a high-school student who is terminally ill. In August, he was cast in the tvN drama Room No. 9. The same year, he was cast in the historical drama Arthdal Chronicles as the younger version of Jang Dong-gun's character. In 2019, he was cast in the tvN drama Her Private Life as the popular visual member of fictional idol group White Ocean.

On July 17, 2019 One revealed following the end of his contract with YGE, he decided to part ways and establish a one-man agency for his future activities. One released his first studio album, PRVT01, on November 11.

Discography

Studio albums

Single albums

Singles

Other releases

Videography

Music videos

Filmography

Film

Television series

Variety show

Web Dramas

References

External links
 

1994 births
Living people
Brave Entertainment artists
YG Entertainment artists
21st-century South Korean male singers
South Korean male rappers
South Korean hip hop record producers
K-pop singers
Show Me the Money (South Korean TV series) contestants
South_Korean_male_idols